Morell-Mermaid was a provincial electoral district for the Legislative Assembly of Prince Edward Island, Canada. Created from mostly 2nd Kings and parts of 3rd and 5th Kings, in 1996. It was named Morell-Fortune Bay from 1996 to 2007.

Members
The riding has elected the following Members of the Legislative Assembly:

Election results

Morell-Mermaid, 2007–2019

Morell-Fortune Cove, 1996–2007

2016 electoral reform plebiscite results

References

 Morell-Mermaid information

Former provincial electoral districts of Prince Edward Island